Madre London (born January 27, 1996) is an American football running back for the Pittsburgh Maulers of the United States Football League (USFL). He played college football at Michigan State and Tennessee.

High school career
London originally attended Bryant High School in Bryant, Arkansas, a suburb of Little Rock. He led the Hornets to a conference title while rushing for 969 yards and 13 touchdowns as a freshman.

London transferred to St. Thomas Aquinas High School in Fort Lauderdale, Florida for his final two years. As a senior he rushed for 871 yards and 16 touchdowns, earning Sun-Sentinel second-team all-Broward County honors and an invitation to the 2014 Semper Fidelis All-American Bowl.

Recruiting
London was considered a four-star recruit by Rivals, and a three-star recruit by 247Sports and ESPN. Rivals also ranked him as the 17th best running back in the nation. He received over two dozen offers, ultimately committing to Michigan State in November 2013.

College career

Michigan State
London played for the Michigan State Spartans from 2014 to 2017, rushing for 924 yards and eight touchdowns while serving a complimentary role behind LJ Scott. He redshirted the 2014 season as the backfield included seniors Jeremy Langford and Nick Hill.

In 2015, London recorded 119 carries for 500 yards and three touchdowns, ranking third on the team in both categories. After impressing in the preseason scrimmages, he was moved to the top of the depth chart by coach Mark Dantonio. London ran for 59 yards and two touchdowns in his collegiate debut against Western Michigan. The following week, he rushed for a game-high 103 yards on 18 attempts in a 31–28 win over #7 Oregon, including a career-long 62-yard run on their opening drive. London started the first six games before spraining his ankle against Rutgers, forcing him to miss the next three games. He rushed for just 101 yards for the remainder of the reason, but that did include a 60-yard-performance against Iowa in the Big Ten Championship Game.

In 2016, London played offensive snaps in just seven games, with sophomore LJ Scott and junior Gerald Holmes taking most of the load at running back. London recorded 28 carries for 120 yards and two touchdowns in his limited role. In his best game that season, he ran for 52 yards and two touchdowns against Rutgers. The Spartans won just three games.

In 2017, London had 83 carries for 304 yards and three touchdowns. He ran for 127 yards in the spring game, eclipsing his previous season's total yardage. In the season opener against Bowling Green, he had 10 carries for 54 yards and a touchdown. He ran for 59 yards and caught a touchdown at #7 Michigan, then rushed for 74 yards and a touchdown the following week at Minnesota. The Spartans beat Washington State 42–17 in the Holiday Bowl to finish with a 10–3 record.

Tennessee
After graduating from Michigan State with his sociology degree in May 2018, London joined Tennessee as a graduate transfer. He was recruited in part by then-offensive quality control assistant Montario Hardesty, himself a former Tennessee and Cleveland Browns running back. In his lone season with the Volunteers, London recorded 206 yards and three touchdowns on 42 attempts, averaging a career-best 4.9 yards per carry, under head coach Jeremy Pruitt.

London contributed two touchdowns in their 59–3 blowout of East Tennessee State, then ran for a season-high 74 yards on just nine carries the following week against UTEP. In their SEC opener against Florida, he had 11 carries for 66 yards and a touchdown. However, London's role decreased drastically after that, recording just nine carries over the last eight games. He was selected to play in the SPIRAL Tropical Bowl at the conclusion of the season.

Collegiate statistics

Professional career

After going undrafted in the 2019 NFL Draft, London signed with the Alphas of The Spring League on October 17, 2020. He rushed for 61 yards on 16 carries in their week two victory over the Conquerors, but that would be his final game with the team as their next game was forfeited and the remainder of the 2020 Fall season was cancelled amidst the COVID-19 pandemic. London then joined the inaugural 2021 Fan Controlled Football season, a new league run by fan decisions where players are drafted to new teams every week. He had 13 carries for 41 yards and three receptions for 23 yards in the four-game season.

London signed with the Cologne Centurions of the newly formed European League of Football (ELF) ahead of the 2021 season. In his league debut, he rushed for 269 yards and three touchdowns as the Centurions lost 55–39 to the Panthers Wrocław. He was then named the week two MVP after rushing for 352 yards and four touchdowns in their home opener against the Barcelona Dragons, which they won 40–12. In their week three victory over the Leipzig Kings, London recorded 348 yards and four touchdowns. He only ran for 85 yards in the next game against the Frankfurt Galaxy, but surpassed the 1,000-yard mark on the season in just four games. In week 7, London once again earned weekly MVP honors for recording 320 yards and four touchdowns in their win against Wrocław. He added 290 yards and four more touchdowns on the ground the following week against Barcelona. After the Centurions' bye week, London earned his third weekly MVP award by recording 138 rushing yards, a rushing touchdown, and a receiving touchdown in their 19–9 home win against Stuttgart. He passed the 2,000-yard milestone in the game, giving his team a 5–4 record and securing a playoff berth. London was rested, along with some other starters, in the regular season finale. In nine regular-season games, he had 269 carries for 2,009 yards and 22 touchdowns, leading the league in all three categories. The Centurions lost 36–6 to the Frankfurt Galaxy in their first playoff game, with London contributing 168 yards and a touchdown. He was one of the four Americans selected to the All-Star team, and was subsequently named the league's Most Valuable Player. London would later be named to American Football International's 2021 All-Europe first team as a top running back in Europe.

In September 2021, London re-signed with the Centurions for the 2022 season. However, in April 2022, he joined the Pittsburgh Maulers of the United States Football League just a few weeks ahead of the league's inaugural season. He was signed by the Maulers as a last-minute replacement for De'Veon Smith.

Statistics

References

External links
 Michigan State Spartans bio
 Tennessee Volunteers bio

Living people
1996 births
American football running backs
Michigan State Spartans football players
Tennessee Volunteers football players
The Spring League players
Fan Controlled Football players
American expatriate sportspeople in Germany
American expatriate players of American football
Players of American football from Arkansas
Sportspeople from Little Rock, Arkansas
People from Bryant, Arkansas
Cologne Centurions (ELF) players
Pittsburgh Maulers (2022) players